is one of the original 40 throws of Judo as compiled by Jigoro Kano.
It is also part of the current 67 Throws of Kodokan Judo.

Technique description 

In this technique,  is to uke's front.  involves tori turning his hips, moving them in front and below uke's hips, with tori's  passing behind uke's back, usually under uke's arm, while minimising the amount of space between tori's back and uke's chest. Tori's  pulls uke's arm to the front, maintaining the balance break.  involves tori lifting with the hips and bending forward while continuing the pull to the front and down, bringing uke onto the mat at tori's feet.

History of technique 

O-goshi is known to have existed in the Tenjin Shinyō-ryū traditional school (koryū) of jujutsu, which Jigoro Kano studied prior to founding judo. In the revised 1920 Gokyo-no-waza, the throw was moved to the  where it remains. O-goshi is often the first throw taught to a beginner as it is relatively simple to throw a compliant partner with control.

Use in other systems 

O-Goshi and similarly applied hip throws are common to all martial arts that have a focus on grappling and throwing. It is named as one of the 20 techniques in Danzan Ryu's Nagete list.

Similar techniques, variants, and aliases 
English aliases:
Major Hip (Roll) Throw
Large Hip Throw

Similar techniques:

 1/2 hip throw: uki goshi
 2/2 hip throw: o goshi
 3/2 hip throw: koshi guruma

Tsuri Goshi

References

External links

Kodokan Koshi waza videos
 Animations of O Goshi.

Judo technique
Throw (grappling)